Leonard Burton Radinsky (1937–1985) was an American paleontologist and expert in fossil odd-toed ungulates and their relatives. He was professor at the University of Chicago from 1967 until his death, serving as chairman of the Department of Anatomy from 1978 to 1983. Born in Staten Island, New York, he earned a bachelor's degree from Cornell University (1958) and his master's and doctorate degrees from Yale University. His works include "Origin and early evolution of North American Tapiroidea", "The fossil record of primate brain evolution", and the textbook The Evolution of Vertebrate Design.

References

External links
Works by Leonard Radinsky at Biodiversity Heritage Library

1937 births
1985 deaths
American paleontologists
University of Chicago faculty
People from Staten Island
Cornell University alumni
Yale University alumni
Scientists from New York (state)